Evan Siddall (born 1965) is the Chief Executive Officer of the Alberta Investment Management Corporation. Previously he served as the CEO of Canada’s state-owned mortgage insurer, the Canada Mortgage and Housing Corporation.

Background
Siddall holds a B.A. in Management Economics from the University of Guelph, and an LL.B. from Osgoode Hall Law School, York University. He also completed the President's Program in Leadership executive education program at Harvard Business School.

Career
Siddall served as President & Chief Executive Officer of the Canada Mortgage and Housing Corporation (CMHC) from January, 2014 to April, 2021.  He was appointed CEO of CMHC for a five-year term effective January 1, 2014.  Siddall's role entailed leading CMHC as it implemented Canada’s 10-year National Housing Strategy. In 2018, Siddall's term was renewed for another two years, to December 2020. On Tuesday, January 14, 2020, Siddall announced that he would not be renewing his term at CMHC,   though on December 18, 2020, he agreed to stay on as President and CEO of CMHC until a new CEO is appointed. 

Siddall entered public service in 2010, joining the Bank of Canada as Special Advisor to the Governor and the Bank’s Senior Representative in Toronto, Canada’s financial centre.
  
Siddall spent five years at Burns Fry Limited (later BMO Nesbitt Burns) (1989-1994) before leaving as Managing Director to become a Vice President of Goldman Sachs & Co in 1997. Promoted to Managing Director in 2001, he left Goldman in 2002 to join Lazard Frères & Co as Resident Managing Director and Head of Canada. Siddall joined Fort Reliance Limited, the parent company of Irving Oil Limited, as Corporate Finance Officer in 2009.

Siddall is a former chair of the Board of Governors of the University of Guelph, and the Counsel of Chairs of Ontario Universities. He is a past president of the Power Plant Contemporary Art Gallery and the Osler Bluff Ski Club. Siddall is also a co-founder of craft brewery Side Launch Brewing Co.

Siddall has been a vocal defender of the Trudeau government's mortgage stress test which has made it harder to qualify for a mortgage in Canada.

Personal life
Siddall was born in Toronto, Ontario and attended Bishop Macdonell Catholic High School in Guelph, Ontario. 

Siddall, who was diagnosed with early-onset Parkinson’s disease in 2014, founded an annual cycling fundraiser for Parkinson’s, the Growling Beaver Brevet.  He served on the board of the Davis Phinney Foundation from 2016-2020.

References

External links

Living people
1965 births
University of Guelph alumni
Osgoode Hall Law School alumni
Canadian chief executives
People with Parkinson's disease
Businesspeople from Toronto